Hendrik Albertus "Henk" Korthals (3 July 1911 – 3 November 1976) was a Dutch politician of the defunct Liberal State Party (LSP) later the Freedom Party (PvdV) and later co-founder of the People's Party for Freedom and Democracy (VVD) and journalist.

Korthals attended a Gymnasium in Dordrecht from May 1923 until June 1929 and applied at the Rotterdam School of Economics in June 1929 majoring in Economics obtaining a Bachelor of Economics degree in June 1931 before graduating with a Master of Economics degree on 12 May 1936. Korthals worked as a journalist for the Nieuwe Rotterdamsche Courant from May 1936 until October 1940 and as civil servant for the department of General Economic Policy of the Ministry of Commerce, Industry and Shipping from October 1940 until November 1945. On 10 May 1940 Nazi Germany invaded the Netherlands and the government fled to London to escape the German occupation. Korthals  was sympathetic with the Dutch resistance against the German occupiers and worked as a journalist and editor for the underground newspaper Het Dagelijks Nieuws from July 1940 until May 1945. Korthals worked as editor for the NRC Handelsblad  from May 1945 until November 1945.

Following the end of World War II Queen Wilhelmina ordered a Recall of Parliament and Korthals was appointment as a Member of the House of Representatives taking the place of the deceased Isidoor Henry Joseph Vos, taking office on 20 November 1945 serving as a frontbencher and the de facto Whip and spokesperson for Economic Affairs, Defence, European Affairs, NATO and deputy spokesperson for Foreign Affairs and Benelux Union. On 24 January 1948 the Freedom Party (PvdV) and the Committee-Oud choose to merge to form the People's Party for Freedom and Democracy (VVD). Korthals was one of the co-founders and became unofficial Deputy Leader of the People's Party for Freedom and Democracy on 10 July 1952. Korthals also served as editor-in-chief of the party newspaper Vrijheid en Democratie from 4 April 1948 until 1 January 1954. Korthals was selected as a Member of the European Coal and Steel Community Parliament and dual served in those positions, taking office on 10 September 1952. Korthals was selected as a first Member of the European Parliament and as the Delegation leader and dual served in those positions, taking office on 1 January 1958.

After the election of 1959 Korthals was appointed as Deputy Prime Minister, Minister of Transport and Water Management and Minister for Overseas Affairs in the Cabinet De Quay, taking office on 19 May 1959. On 1 September 1959 the Minister for Overseas Affairs was renamed as the Minister for Suriname and Netherlands Antilles Affairs. After the Leader of the People's Party for Freedom and Democracy and Parliamentary leader of the People's Party for Freedom and Democracy in the House of Representatives Pieter Oud announced his retirement from national politics and that he wouldn't stand for the election of 1963, he approached Korthals as a candidate to succeed him, but the People's Party for Freedom and Democracy leadership favored Minister of the Interior Edzo Toxopeus, in response Korthals withdrew his name for consideration and Toxopeus became the new Leader. In February 1963 Korthals announced that he wouldn't stand for the election of 1963. Following the cabinet formation of 1963 Korthals was not giving a cabinet post in the new cabinet, the Cabinet De Quay was replaced by the Cabinet Marijnen on 24 July 1963. Korthals remained in active in national politics, in March 1964 he was nominated as a Member of the Council of State, taking office on 1 April 1964. Korthals also became active in the public sector and occupied numerous seats as a nonprofit director on several boards of directors and supervisory boards (Safe Traffic Netherlands, Radio Netherlands Worldwide, Oxfam Novib and the International Institute of Social History) and served on several state commissions and councils on behalf of the government (Council for Culture, Cadastre Agency and the Dutch Transport Safety Board). On 3 November 1976 Korthals died unexpectedly during a visit to the United States at the age of 65.

Decorations

References

External links

  Drs. H.A. (Henk) Korthals Parlement & Politiek

 

 

 

 

1911 births
1976 deaths
Deputy Prime Ministers of the Netherlands
Dutch magazine editors
Dutch members of the Dutch Reformed Church
Dutch newspaper editors
Dutch nonprofit directors
Dutch nonprofit executives
Dutch political journalists
Dutch political party founders
Dutch political writers
Freedom Party (Netherlands) politicians
Grand Crosses of the Order of the Crown (Belgium)
Grand Officiers of the Légion d'honneur
Grand Officers of the Order of Orange-Nassau
Honorary Order of the Yellow Star
Knights Commander of the Order of Merit of the Federal Republic of Germany
Knights of the Order of the Netherlands Lion
Liberal State Party politicians
Members of the Council of State (Netherlands)
Members of the House of Representatives (Netherlands)
MEPs for the Netherlands 1958–1979
Ministers of Colonial Affairs of the Netherlands
Ministers of Kingdom Relations of the Netherlands
Ministers of Transport and Water Management of the Netherlands
Municipal councillors in South Holland
Oxfam people
People from Dordrecht
People from Voorschoten
People's Party for Freedom and Democracy MEPs
People's Party for Freedom and Democracy politicians
20th-century Dutch civil servants
20th-century Dutch journalists
20th-century Dutch male writers
20th-century Dutch politicians